Permabooks was a paperback division of Doubleday, established by Doubleday in 1948. Although published by Doubleday's Garden City Publishing Company in Garden City, Long Island, the Permabooks editorial office was located at 14 West 49th Street in Manhattan.

Promoted with the slogans Books of Permanent Value for Permanent Use and Books to Keep, the early Permabooks were priced at 35 cents. They did not feature the flexible covers usually associated with paperback books. Instead, as the name implies, the first Permabooks were designed in a more durable format with board covers. The interior looked like a paperback, but the exterior, measuring 4⅜" wide by 6½" deep, gave the impression of a reduced-size hardcover. The edges of the stiff, unflexible board cover extended 1/8" past the trim of the interior pages.

The concept was heralded in a back cover blurb:
Permabooks combine the virtues of handiness for the pocket and durability for the library shelf. They are selected with care to provide reliable books for education and recreation. Each has been printed from new plates and bound in boards with special wear-resistant finish.

The initial format only lasted three years, with Doubleday switching to the standard paperback appearance in 1951, as indicated by Hyde Park Books' breakdown of the numbering sequence:
The binding influenced editorial decisions. There was no sense publishing a durable book that no one had reason to keep, so the first titles were Best-Loved Poems, How to Write Letters, Best Quotations for All Occasions and other reference-style works. The numbering sequence: P1-P92, hardbacks; there was no P93; P94-P97, hardbacks; P98, paper; P99-P101, hard; P102 on were all paperback. Plus, P5, P7, P25, P65, P89 were re-issued as paperback without being re-numbered. In 1954, the company was purchased by Pocket Books, which began numbering Permabooks with M1000, skipped to M1600, skipped for the third title to M2001, skipped yet again to M3002 for the fourth title, and then numbered sequentially until M5014, when it jumped to M7500.

The Perma Star imprint began in 1952. Perma Special, which also began that year, was a higher quality line selling for 50 cents. These imprints included originals by Richard Stark (a Donald E. Westlake pseudonym) and Ed McBain (an Evan Hunter pseudonym).

In 1954, Doubleday sold Permabooks to Pocket Books, which kept the Permabooks name as one of their imprints, issuing both originals and reprints.

Partial list of the 1948-50 Permabooks

P1 Best Loved Poems edited by Richard Charlton MacKenzie, 1948
P2 How to Write Letters for All Occasions by Sheff and Ingalls
P3 Best Quotations for All Occasions
P4 Common Errors in English and How to Avoid Them by Alexander M. Witherspoon, PhD
P5 The Standard Bartender's Guide by Patrick Gavin Duffy, 1948
P6 Sex and the Love Life by William J. Fielding, 1948
P7 Eat and Reduce! by Victor H. Lindlahr
P8 The Stainless Steel Kimono by Elliott Chaze, 1948 - *PB Best Jokes for All Occasions edited by Moulton
P9 Ida Bailey Allen's Cookbook"
P10 The Conquest of Fear by Basil King, 1948
P11 How Shall I Tell My Child? A Parent's Guide to the Sex Education of Children by Belle S. Mooney, 1948
P13 Something to Live By by Dorothea Kopplin
P14 Sight Without Glasses by Dr. Harold M. Peppard
P15 Blackstone's Tricks Anyone Can Do by Harry Blackstone, 1948
P16 Fortune Telling for Fun and Popularity by Paul Showers
P17 The Handy Encyclopedia of Useful Information by Lewis Copeland (editor). Research Editors: Robert Rahtz, Leonard D. Abbott and Paul Doring
P19 Good English Made Easy by J. Milnor Dorey
P20 Mathematics for Home and Business by William L. Schaaf, Ph.D.
P21 Modern Sex Life by Edwin W. Hirsch, B.S., M.D.
P25 Handy Legal Adviser for Home and Business by Samuel G. Kling
P26 What Your Dreams Mean by Herbert Hespro
P32 Photography as a Hobby by Fred B. Barton
P33 Winning Poker by Oswald Jacoby
P34 The Handy Book of Hobbies by Geoffrey Mott-Smith, 1949
P36 Astrology for Everyone by Evangeline Adams
P37 Numerology by Morris C. Goodman
P38 Three Famous French Novels (Abridged) Madame Bovary, Mlle. de Maupin and Sapho
P39 Character Reading Made Easy by Meier
P40 Stop Me If You've Heard This One by Lew Lehr, Cal Tinney and Roger Bower, 1949
P41 Best Short Stories of Jack LondonP42 The Art of Living by Norman Vincent Peale, D.D.
P43 The Human Body and How it Works by Tokay
P44 A Handy Illustrated Guide to FootballP45 The Golden Book of Prayer edited by D. B. Aldrich
P47 A Handy Illustrated Guide to BasketballP48 Better Speech for You by Daniel P. Eginton, PhD
P50 Psychoanalysis and Love by Andre Tridon
P52 A Handy Illustrated Guide to BowlingP53 A Handy Illustrated Guide to BoxingP54 Magic Explained by Walter B. Gibson
P55 The Handy Book of Indoor Games by Geoffrey Matt-Smith
P57 Understanding Human Nature by Alfred Adler
P58 Charles H. Goren's Bridge Quiz Book"
P59 Reading Handwriting for Fun and Popularity by Dorothy Sara
P60 Be Glad You're Neurotic by louis E. Bisch, PhD
P61 Grammar Made Easy by Richard D. Mallery
P62 Permabook of Art Masterpieces, Explanatory Text by Ray Brock
P63 The Handy Book of Gardening by Wilkinson and Tiedjens
P64 The Meaning of Psychoanalysis by Martin W. Peck
P65 Know Your Real Abilities by C. V. and M. E. Broadley
P66 Stories of Famous Operas by Harold V. Milligan
P67 The Science Fiction Galaxy edited by Groff Conklin
P68 How to Use Your Imagination to Make Money by C. B. Roth
P69 Favorite Verse of Edgar A. Guest
P70 Perma Handy World Atlas
P71 Goren's Canasta Up-to-Date by Charles H. Goren
P72 Meditations and My Daily Strength by Preston Bradley
P73 Personality Pointers by Jill Edwards
P74 South Sea Stories of W. Somerset Mougham
P75 Manners for Millions by Sophie C. Hadida
P76 The Care and Handling of Dogs by Jack Baird
P77 A Handy Illustrated Guide to Baseball
P78 Buried Treasure by Ken Krippene
P79 Everyday Speech by Bess Sondel
P80 The New Standard Ready Reckoner
P81 How to Read Palms by Litzka Raymond, 1950
P82 The Perma Week-End Companion edited by E. Mitchell
P83 How to Travel for Fun by Helen Eva Yates

Sources
Davis, Kenneth C. Two-Bit Culture: The Paperbacking of America, Boston: Houghton Mifflin, 1984.
Permabooks List of Published Titles from the Back Cover of P81 How to Read Palms by Litzka Raymond, 1950

References

External links
"Once Doubleday Was a King, Now House Gets a New Look" by Terry Considine Williams. The New York Times, October 6, 1996

Book publishing companies based in New York (state)
Publishing companies established in 1948